The Nightmarist is an original graphic novel written and illustrated by Duncan Rouleau and published by Active Images in 2006.

Reception
 This is a dark fantasy that is denser and more layered than most manga, but like nothing coming out of the major U.S. comics publishers. A- -Bag and Boards, Variety.com 2006

Film
The Nightmarist has been optioned by Paramount Pictures and Duncan Rouleau has completed the script adaptation.

Notes

References

External links
 The Nightmarist at Active Images

2006 books
2006 comics debuts
American graphic novels